Feline is the seventh studio album by the Stranglers and was released on 22 January 1983 on the Epic record label, their first for the label. The first edition came with a free one-sided 7" single "Aural Sculpture Manifesto". Feline drew heavily on two of the dominant musical influences in Europe of the time, by using primarily acoustic guitars and electronic drums as well as Dave Greenfield's synthesizers. The American edition of the album included the British hit single "Golden Brown" as the closing track on side one of the original vinyl (and the fifth song in on the CD version).

Feline peaked higher than their earlier studio album release, La Folie, reaching No. 4 in the UK Albums Chart.

There were three singles released from Feline: the first was "European Female" which reached No. 9 in the UK Singles Chart in January 1983, and was followed by a remixed 7" version of "Midnight Summer Dream" in February (which peaked at No. 35 in the UK). The third and final single released was "Paradise" (released in July 1983) which reached No. 48.

Reception
The album received a mixed reception from fans and critics alike. Some fans embraced the band's new sound, while others felt it wasn't the same band that recorded their debut Rattus Norvegicus in 1977.

Trouser Press described the album as "restrained and dignified, but also lackluster and boring." Alex Ogg, in a retrospective two and a half stars review for AllMusic, wrote, "While not an instant classic, it does repay repeated listening ... Instead of the belligerent tunefulness of yesteryear, the Stranglers were trying to expand their sound and reach. Too often on this lackluster effort, however, it comes across as boring and unengaging.

Track listing

 Recorded at Good Earth Studios, London
 Recorded in New York, April 1983
 Recorded in London, June 1983
 Recorded live at The Zenith, Paris, 29 April 1985
 Full title: "(The Strange Circumstances Which Lead To) Vladimir and Olga (Requesting Rehabilitation in a Siberian Health Resort as a Result of Stress in Furthering the People's Policies)". The first of six parts of a "series" about a man named Vladimir. The second part, "Vladimir and Sergei", appears on the non-Stranglers album Fire & Water by Jean-Jacques Burnel and Dave Greenfield. The rest appear as B-sides on various Stranglers singles.

2019 vinyl reissue 
Limited to 1.000 numbered copies, the original 9-track album is coupled with a bonus 9-track album, entitled Clawing at the Sky, which features extended 12" mixes, B-sides and unreleased mixes.
Side A and B as per original vinyl edition
Clawing at the Sky

Personnel
Credits adapted from the album liner notes, except where noted.
The Stranglers
Hugh Cornwell – vocals, guitar
Jean-Jacques Burnel – bass, vocals (lead vocals on 	"European Female" and "Paradise")
Dave Greenfield – keyboards
Jet Black – drums, percussion
Additional personnel
Anna Von Stern – backing vocals ("Paradise") 
France Lhermitte – backing vocals ("Paradise")
Technical
The Stranglers – producer
Steve Churchyard – producer (except "Aural Sculpture"), engineer
Tony Visconti – mixing
Nick Marchant – art direction, design
Tim Widdal – design
Bonus tracks
Dagmar Krause – backing vocals ("Here and There")
The Stranglers – producer (all tracks), mixing ("Vladimir and Olga")
Steve Churchyard – producer ("Savage Breast")
Laurie Latham – producer ("Here and There")
Ted Hayton – mixing ("Midnight Summer Dream/European Female")
Gary Lucas – engineer ("Vladimir and Olga")
Glenn Tommey – engineer ("Vladimir and Olga")

Charts

References

1983 albums
Epic Records albums
The Stranglers albums
New wave albums by English artists